Progression records for shot put must be set in properly conducted, official competitions under the standing IAAF rules unless modified by World Masters Athletics. Divisions are based upon the age of the athlete, with the category giving a minimum and implying a maximum age (5 years higher than the minimum). So, for example, the M35 division consists of male athletes who have reached the age of 35 but have not yet reached the age of 40, so exactly from their 35th birthday to the day before their 40th birthday.

Weights thrown vary with the division in the following way:

The youngest divisions throw exactly the same 16 lb/7.260 kg implement as the Open division. The records are as follows.

Key

M35
Oldfield improved the record three times during his series on his 35th birthday in Berkeley, California.  His 22.19 was just 3 cm short of the standing official world record, though he had thrown 22.86 five years earlier, but that throw had been disallowed because Oldfield was a professional, against the rules at that time.

M40

M45

M50

M55

Note: Liedtke's ratified mark by World Masters Athletics is 17.50, but other reports say he threw 17.77 that day

M60

M65

M70

M75

M80

M85

See also

Shot put
Masters athletics

References

External links
 Masters Athletics Shot Put list
 All Time Athletics

Masters athletics world record progressions
Shot put
Shot